The 2019 Tour of Austria was the 71st edition of the Tour of Austria cycling stage race. It began with a prologue in Wels and finished atop the Kitzbüheler Horn after six road stages, covering . The race was ranked 2.1 in the 2019 UCI Europe Tour.

Ben Hermans, of Belgium and the  team, won the race overall for the second consecutive year. Unlike previous editions, the 2019 Tour of Austria included a youth classification for the under-23 rider placed highest in the general classification.

Teams
Eighteen teams competed in the 2019 Tour of Austria, including three UCI WorldTeams, seven UCI Professional Continental Teams, and eight UCI Continental Teams. The list of teams competing is as follows.

Route

Stages

Prologue
6 July 2019 – Wels, Individual Time Trial (ITT)

Stage 1
7 July 2019 – Grieskirchen to Freistadt,

Stage 2
8 July 2019 – Zwettl to Wiener Neustadt,

Stage 3
9 July 2019 – Kirchschlag to Frohnleiten,

Stage 4
10 July 2019 – Radstadt to Fuscher Törl,

Stage 5
11 July 2019 – Bruck an der Großglocknerstraße to Kitzbühel,

Stage 6
12 July 2019 – Kitzbühel to Kitzbüheler Horn,

Classification leadership

Final classification standings

General classification

Points classification

Mountains classification

Young rider classification

Austrian riders classification

Team classification

Notes

References

External Links
 
 

2019
2019 in Austrian sport
2019 UCI Europe Tour